Patricia A. Jennings is a Professor of Education at the University of Virginia.

Education and early career
Patricia A. Jennings received a BA from Antioch College in 1977, an M.Ed. from Saint Mary's College in 1980, and a Ph.D. from the University of California Davis in 2004. Before her degrees in education and human development, Jennings also studied Buddhism at the Buddhist Naropa Institute in Boulder, Colorado, and later founded a Montessori school that taught meditation during the late 1980s.

Research
She was an associate professor at the Curry School of Education, University of Virginia until 2019, when she was promoted to Full Professor. She has also served as a Research Assistant Professor at Pennsylvania State University. Jennings's book Mindfulness for Teachers: Simple Skills For Peace And Productivity In The Classroom, was published in 2015. 
Jennings is to co-creator of the Cultivating Awareness and Resilience in Education (CARE) program, a thirty-hour mindfulness-based professional development program. The goal of the program is to help Pre-K-12 teachers deal with in-class stress. It was tested in a clinical trial in 2017, which involved 224 elementary school teachers, evaluating the program through teacher questionnaires and classroom observations. The results of the research showed that CARE can “increase teacher social and emotional competence and the quality of classroom interactions,” according to the New York Times. It was the largest study of its kind to date at the time. Following this, she worked on the Compassionate Schools Project research project, intended to teach and provide mindfulness skills to elementary students.

In 2018, she received the Catherine Kerr Award for Courageous and Compassionate Science.

Her book The Trauma-Sensitive Classroom was then published in 2019. Jennings is a member of the National Academy of Sciences Committee on Fostering Healthy Mental, Emotional, and Behavioral Development among Children and Youth.

References

Living people
Antioch College alumni
Saint Mary's College of California alumni
University of California, Davis alumni
Naropa University alumni
University of Virginia faculty
American education writers
Year of birth missing (living people)